The 2005–06 Bundesliga was the 43rd season of the Bundesliga, Germany's premier football league. It began on 5 August 2005 and concluded on 13 May 2006.

Teams
Eighteen teams competed in the league – the top fifteen teams from the previous season and the three teams promoted from the 2. Bundesliga. The promoted teams were 1. FC Köln, MSV Duisburg and Eintracht Frankfurt. 1. FC Köln and Eintracht Frankfurt returned to the top flight after an absence of one year while MSV Duisburg returned in the top flight after an absence of six years. They replaced VfL Bochum, Hansa Rostock and SC Freiburg, ending their top flight spells of three, ten and two years respectively.

Team overview

(*) Promoted from 2. Bundesliga.

League table

Results

Overall 
Most wins - Bayern Munich (22)
Fewest wins - MSV Duisburg (5)
Most draws - Hannover 96 (17)
Fewest draws - Hamburger SV (5)
Most losses - 1. FC Köln (18)
Fewest losses - Bayern Munich (3)
Most goals scored - Werder Bremen (79)
Fewest goals scored - Arminia Bielefeld (32)
Most goals conceded - 1. FC Kaiserslautern and 1. FC Köln (71)
Fewest goals conceded - Hamburger SV (30)

Top scorers

Champion squad

References

External links

2005–06 Bundesliga on kicker.de

Bundesliga seasons
1
Germany